Gabriela Guillén Álvarez (born 1 March 1992) is a Costa Rican footballer who plays as a defender for Icelandic Úrvalsdeild kvenna club Þór/KA and the Costa Rica women's national team.

Career 
She played for Costa Rica against the United States in 2012.
   
Guillén has participated in under-17 and under-20 World Cups with Costa Rica, playing two matches in FIFA U-17 Women's World Cup New Zealand 2008 against Ghana and Germany, and playing no matches in the FIFA U-20 Women's World Cup Germany 2010.

In 2014 she was part of the Costa Rican team that qualified for the first time to a senior world cup, in this case the 2015 FIFA Women's World Cup, in which then she participated in one match against Spain.

She was also part of the Costa Rica Women's National Football Team that won a silver medal in the 2018 Central American and Caribbean Games. Later that same year, she was called to play with Costa Rica in the 2019 FIFA Women's World Cup qualification, which Costa Rica failed to qualify.

References

External links
 
 Profile  at Fedefutbol
 

1992 births
Living people
Women's association football defenders
Costa Rican women's footballers
People from Tibás
Costa Rica women's international footballers
2015 FIFA Women's World Cup players
Pan American Games bronze medalists for Costa Rica
Pan American Games medalists in football
Footballers at the 2019 Pan American Games
Central American Games gold medalists for Costa Rica
Central American Games medalists in football
Creighton Bluejays women's soccer players
Costa Rican expatriate footballers
Costa Rican expatriate sportspeople in the United States
Expatriate women's soccer players in the United States
Medalists at the 2019 Pan American Games